Hagbard, the brother of Haki and son of Hamund, was a famous Scandinavian sea-king in Norse mythology. He is mentioned in Skáldskaparmál, Ynglinga saga, Nafnaþulur, Völsunga saga and Gesta Danorum. The heroes' connections with other legendary characters place the events in the 5th century AD.

Hagbard remained well-known until recent times in the legend of Hagbard and Signy. This famous legend tells that Hagbard fell in love with Signy, the daughter of king Sigar, the nephew of king Siggeir (of the Völsunga saga), a love affair which ended in their deaths, when Sigar wanted to have Hagbard hanged. This legend is told most fully in Gesta Danorum (book 7).

However, most legends surrounding Hagbard are probably lost. In the Völsunga saga, Gudrun and Brynhild have a discussion on the "greatest of men" referring to a legend now lost, where Hagbard is mentioned together with Haki's sons, who have not yet avenged their sisters by killing the evil Sigar (the feud with Sigar is still going on and Hagbard not yet hanged):

Snorri Sturluson wrote in the Ynglinga saga that Hagbard occasionally plundered together with his brother Haki. Concerning, the adventures and death of the Swedish king Jorund (whom Snorri makes a successor of Haki), he cites the poem Háleygjatal by a Norwegian skald named Eyvindr skáldaspillir containing the Kenning Sigar's steed referring to the legend of Hagbard and Signy:

The same kenning appears with Hagbard's name in a stanza from Ynglingatal, which Snorri also quotes in the same section:

Notes

Heroes in Norse myths and legends